Surgery Saved My Life is a documentary series which aired for two years on Discovery Channel. It is a medical show that features people with life-threatening health problems. The cameras follow the patients as they undergo surgery and the doctors as they prepare for and follow through on the life-saving operations.

Surgery Saved My Life was never released on video.

Overview
People with life-threatening health problems undergo surgery.

Cast
The show was narrated by Ed Cunningham.  Each episode consisted of different patients and doctors.

References

External links
Official Website

2006 American television series debuts
2008 American television series endings
2000s American documentary television series
Discovery Channel original programming